Ab Gonji (also Romanized as Āb Gonjī, Āb-e Gonjī, and Ab Ganjī; also known as Āb-i-Gunji and Ab-i-Gunjishk) is a village in Shahid Modarres Rural District, in the Central District of Shushtar County, Khuzestan Province, Iran. At the 2006 census, its population was 28, in 7 families.

References 

Populated places in Shushtar County